Koidula may refer to:

Lydia Koidula (1843–1886), Estonian poet
Koidula, Võru County, village in Setomaa Parish, Võru County
 Koidula railway station
Koidula, Saare County, village in Kaarma Parish, Saare County